Fresco is a surname. Notable people with the surname include:
 (1903–1942), Dutch painter, victim of the Holocaust
Jacque Fresco (1916–2017), American polymath
Louise Fresco (born 1952), Dutch scientist, director and writer
Michael Fresco, American television director and producer
Monte Fresco (1936–2013), English photographer
Victor Fresco (born 1958), American film writer, brother of Michael
Zohar Fresco (born 1969), Israeli percussionist and composer
Abraham Aslan Fresco Effendi (1849-1912), Jewish Ottoman banker, financial advisor to Sultan Abdul Hamid II